Robert Frank Knight (1879-1955) was an English cricketer active from 1900 to 1921 who played for Northamptonshire (Northants). He was born in Rushden on 10 August 1879 and died in Kettering on 9 January 1955. He appeared in 22 first-class matches as a righthanded batsman who bowled leg spin. He scored 408 runs with a highest score of 67 and took 21 wickets with a best performance of six for 90.

Notes

1879 births
1955 deaths
English cricketers
Northamptonshire cricketers